Cary Feldmann (born July 11, 1950) is an American former track and field athlete who competed in the javelin throw.

At national level he won one American title at the USA Outdoor Track and Field Championships, topping the podium at the 1973 event. He had been runner-up nationally in 1971. Collegiately he competed for the Washington Huskies and was the 1971 winner at the NCAA Outdoor Championships, having placed third the year before. This ranked him fourth globally for that season.

International competitions

National titles
USA Outdoor Track and Field Championships
Javelin throw: 1973

References

Living people
1950 births
American male javelin throwers
Pan American Games gold medalists for the United States
Pan American Games medalists in athletics (track and field)
Athletes (track and field) at the 1971 Pan American Games
Washington Huskies men's track and field athletes
Medalists at the 1971 Pan American Games